Neil MacGill Stevenson (December 26, 1930 – November 21, 2009) was a rear admiral and Chief of Chaplains of the United States Navy.

Biography
Stevenson was born in Brooklyn in 1930. He attended the Bay Ridge United Presbyterian Church (now the Bay Ridge United Church). He graduated from Fort Hamilton High School in 1948, Tarkio College (B.A., 1952) and Pittsburgh Theological Seminary (M.Div., 1955) before attending Princeton Theological Seminary (M.Th., 1968).

Stevenson died on November 21, 2009, in Williamsburg, Virginia. He was buried in Arlington National Cemetery on February 26, 2010.

Career
Stevenson was commissioned in the United States Naval Reserve on June 30, 1956, and reported to the Chaplain School in Newport, Rhode Island for training in April 1957.

After serving in the Vietnam War, Stevenson was named Senior Chaplain at Naval Training Center Orlando. He later served as Fleet Chaplain of the United States Pacific Fleet Deputy Chief of Chaplains. Stevenson was Chief of Chaplains from 1983 until his retirement in 1985.

After his retirement from the Navy, he was pastor of Williamsburg Presbyterian Church in southern Virginia for 10 years, helped launch the Stone House Presbyterian Church in Toano, Va., and was interim pastor at Yorkminster Presbyterian Church.

References

External links
 

1930 births
2009 deaths
20th-century American clergy
American Christian clergy
American Presbyterian ministers
Burials at Arlington National Cemetery
Chiefs of Chaplains of the United States Navy
Fort Hamilton High School alumni
People from Brooklyn
Pittsburgh Theological Seminary alumni
Princeton Theological Seminary alumni
Tarkio College alumni
United States Navy chaplains
United States Navy personnel of the Vietnam War